Béthencourt is a commune in department Nord, Nord-Pas-de-Calais, France.

Béthencourt may also refer to:

France
 Béthencourt-sur-Mer, a French commune in department Somme, Picardie
 Béthencourt-sur-Somme, a French commune in department Somme, Picardie
 Béthencourt, a former parish brought under the commune of Dancourt, Seine-Maritime
 Béthencourt, a hamlet of the commune Tincques, department Pas-de-Calais, in Nord-Pas-de-Calais

People with the surname
 Jean de Béthencourt (1362–1425), French explorer and conquistador
 Antoine de Béthencourt, French general of the French revolution, participated in the Battle of Mas Deu
 Jacques de Béthencourt ( early 16th century), French physician

See also 
 Bettencourt